Agloe is a fictional hamlet in Colchester, Delaware County, New York, United States, that became an actual landmark after mapmakers made up the community as a phantom settlement, an example of a fictitious entry similar to a trap street. Agloe was put onto the map in order to catch plagiarism, as it appears only on the original cartographers' map and has a population of one. Soon, using fictional "copyright traps" became a typical strategy in mapmaker design to thwart plagiarism. Agloe was known as a "paper town" because of this.
Agloe is also known for appearing in the American romantic mystery novel Paper Towns by John Green and its film adaptation.

History
In the 1930s, General Drafting founder Otto G. Lindberg and an assistant, Ernest Alpers, assigned an anagram of their initials to a dirt-road intersection in the Catskill Mountains: NY 206 and Morton Hill Road, north of Roscoe, New York. The town was designed as a "copyright trap" to enable the publishers to detect others copying their maps.

In the 1950s, a general store was built at the intersection on the map, and was given the name Agloe General Store because the name was on the Esso maps. Later, Agloe appeared on a Rand McNally map after the mapmaker got the name of the "hamlet" from the Delaware County administration. When Esso threatened to sue Rand McNally for the assumed copyright infringement which the "trap" had revealed, the latter pointed out that the place had now become real and therefore no infringement could be established.

Eventually, the store went out of business; but the Agloe General Store still appears on Google Maps. Agloe itself continued to appear on maps as recently as the 1990s, but has now been deleted. It briefly appeared on Google Maps. The United States Geological Survey added "Agloe (Not Official)" to the Geographic Names Information System database on February 25, 2014.

In popular culture 
Agloe is featured in the novel Paper Towns by John Green (released in 2008) and its film adaptation (released in 2015). During the film and in the novel, one of the main characters, Margo, runs away from home, leaving personal clues to her friend and neighbor Quentin of where she has gone. He then discovers she is hiding in one of the US's most famous "paper towns": Agloe, New York. The book's name is based on the several paper towns that Quentin discovers and encounters while searching for Margo.

Agloe is also featured prominently in the 2022 novel The Cartographers by Peng Shepherd.

References

          

Fictitious entries
Fictional populated places in New York (state)
Catskills
Fictional elements introduced in the 1930s